Hamlin is a village in Salem Township, Wayne County, Pennsylvania, United States. Hamlin is located at the intersection of Pennsylvania Route 191/Pennsylvania Route 196 and Pennsylvania Route 590.

References

Unincorporated communities in Wayne County, Pennsylvania
Unincorporated communities in Pennsylvania